Sturgeon Weir 184F is an Indian reserve of the Peter Ballantyne Cree Nation in Saskatchewan. It is 55 kilometres southeast of Flin Flon. In the 2016 Canadian Census, it recorded a population of 81 living in 20 of its 26 total private dwellings. In the same year, its Community Well-Being index was calculated at 51 of 100, compared to 58.4 for the average First Nations community and 77.5 for the average non-Indigenous community.

References

Indian reserves in Saskatchewan
Division No. 18, Saskatchewan
Peter Ballantyne Cree Nation